Edward Louis Howard (November 25, 1926 – January 4, 2011) was an American politician who served as a Republican member of the Pennsylvania State Senate for the 10th district from 1971 to 1986.

Early life and education
Howard was born in Jacksonville, Florida.  Soon after his birth, the family moved to Excelsior, Minnesota where he completed high school.

In 1944, he joined the U.S. Army.  He worked as a military policeman in a unit preparing for the invasion of Japan until 1945.  After his discharge from the military, he received a B.A. in History from the University of Minnesota.

In 1959, he moved to Doylestown, Pennsylvania to run the National Fiberstok Corporation.  He eventually purchased the corporation and worked as president and CEO until 1986.

Career
Howard was elected to the Pennsylvania Senate for the 10th district and served from 1971 to 1986.  He served as chairman of the Senate Finance Committee.

He died in Doylestown, Pennsylvania and is interred at the Doylestown Cemetery.

References

1926 births
2011 deaths
20th-century American politicians
United States Army personnel of World War II
Burials in Pennsylvania
Republican Party Pennsylvania state senators
People from Doylestown, Pennsylvania

University of Minnesota College of Liberal Arts alumni